This is a list of J3 League transfers made during both winter and summer transfer windows of the 2023 season by each club. The winter transfer window will go from 6 January to 31 March, while the summer transfer window will go from 21 July to 18 August. Free agents will be allowed through 8 September.

Azul Claro Numazu

Ehime FC

Fukushima United

Gainare Tottori

FC Gifu

Giravanz Kitakyushu

FC Imabari

Iwate Grulla Morioka

Kagoshima United

Kamatamare Sanuki

Kataller Toyama

Matsumoto Yamaga

Nagano Parceiro

Nara Club

FC Osaka

FC Ryukyu

SC Sagamihara

Tegevajaro Miyazaki

Vanraure Hachinohe

YSCC Yokohama

See also
List of J1 League football transfers 2023
List of J2 League football transfers 2023
List of Japan Football League football transfers 2023

References

External links
J3 League 2023 Transfers
J.League News 
JFA/J.League 2022 DSPs to fully join the league on 2023

2023
Transfers